Syrians in Austria include migrants from Syria to Austria, as well as their descendants. The number of Syrians in Austria is estimated at around  18,000 people in December 2015, and it consists mainly of refugees of the Syrian Civil War.

Migration history
During the European migrant crisis of 2014–2015 hundreds of thousands of Syrian refugees of the Syrian Civil War entered Austria to seek refugee status. The European migrant crisis was especially accelerated when on 4 September 2015, Chancellor Werner Faymann of Austria, in conjunction with Chancellor Angela Merkel of Germany, announced that migrants would be allowed to cross the border from Hungary into Austria and onward to Germany, and early on 5 September 2015, buses with migrants began crossing the Austro-Hungarian border.

Notable people
 Tarafa Baghajati, activist and writer of Syrian origin
 Omar Hamdi, artist of Syrian-Kurdish origin
 Alisar Ailabouni, fashion and model 
 Fadi Merza, kickboxing and Muay Thai of Syrian origin
 Nadja Maleh, Austrian actress, singer, cabaret artist and director.

See also
 Arabs in Austria
 Turks in Austria
 Immigration to Austria

 Islam in Austria
 Syrian diaspora

References

 
Middle Eastern diaspora in Austria
Ethnic groups in Austria